Arthur Lake may refer to:
Arthur Lake (bishop) (1569–1626), bishop of Bath and Wells
Arthur Lake (actor) (1905–1987), American actor known best for Dagwood Bumstead, the bumbling husband of Blondie
Arthur Lake (MP) (1598–1633), English politician

See also
Arthur Lakes (1844–1917), geologist, artist, writer, teacher and minister
Lake Arthur (disambiguation)